Alb'Swiss TV is an Albanian news television station based in Geneva, Switzerland. Alb'Swiss has been present in the field of television media since 2015. The station is a general information broadcaster that embraces the coverage of social, cultural and political issues. It has been characterized by a simplicity of language, inclined to report the news by respecting journalistic ethics, monitoring information sources, and constantly searching for the truth. This approach has placed in a respected position in the media landscape.

History 
This online television station in Switzerland was founded in 2015.

TV programs

 Revista televizive
 News Show Swiss
 7 Ditë
 Diaspora në Zvicër (Diaspora in Switzerland)

References 

Television networks in Albania
Mass media in Tirana